This is a list of monuments and memorials that were established as public displays and symbols of the Spanish–American War of 1898.

Cuba

There have been numerous memorials to the war in Cuba, including sites preserved by engineers right after the war and numerous monuments that have been preserved by Cuba to this day, although few Americans have been able to visit since U.S. banned travel to Cuba in 1963.
, Havana, inaugurated March 8, 1925.  Created by Cuban architect Félix Cabarrocas and Spanish sculptor Moisés de Huerta; included two marble columns and two allegorical figures representing fraternity between the Republic of Cuba and the United States. The monument was "decapitated" by removal of the eagle atop the columns in 1961 after the Cuban Revolution when relations with the U.S. deteriorated.
Other Havana memorials included busts of Theodore Roosevelt, William McKinley, and Leonard Wood (military governor of Cuba).
Monument to 71st New York at San Juan Hill, San Juan Hill
Monumento en Playa de Daiquiri, Santiago de Cuba

Puerto Rico
See Puerto Rican Campaign#Markers, monuments and tombstones

Spain

Monumento a Vara de Rey, Madrid a monument to General Joaquín Vara del Rey y Rubio, who led Spanish forces against overwhelming odds at the Battle of El Caney.
 Monument to Vara de Rey, Ibiza
Monumento a los Héroes de Cavite y Santiago, in Cartagena, a monument to the heroes of the naval battles of Santiago de Cuba and Cavite (Battle of Manila Bay)

United States

Puerto Rico
Puerto Rico became part of the U.S. as a result of the war, and the Puerto Rican Campaign, within the Caribbean theatre of the war, included a land invasion in the south on July 25, 1898 which ended August 13, when the armistice ending the war was signed.
El monumento en Guánica a los veteranos de la Guerra Hispano Americana, Guánica, erected in 1938.
Yauco Battle Site, site of the July 25–26, 1898 Battle of Yauco, the first major engagement of the campaign, was listed on the U.S. National Register of Historic Places in 2008.

Arizona
 Bucky O'Neill Monument, Courthouse Plaza, Prescott
 Spanish War Veterans Monument - Tucson, AZ
  In Memory of All Spanish American War Veterans Plaque - Fountain Hills, AZ
  GAR & USWV "United Spanish War Veterans" Stone Column - Globe, AZ

Arkansas
 "The Boys of 1898", Spanish–American War memorial at MacArthur Park, Little Rock

California
 California Volunteers, also known as the Spanish–American War Memorial, San Francisco
 "Spanish American War Memorial", Oakland 
Spanish–American War Memorial, 7th Regiment Monument, Pershing Square, Los Angeles 
This is the oldest work of public art in the City of Los Angeles, completed in 1900.  It is designated as Los Angeles Cultural Heritage Monument No. 480).
The Hiker statue (1949), Capitol Park, Sacramento.

District of Columbia
 Cuban Friendship Urn, Washington D.C.

Illinois
Memorial Hall
 "Spanish–American War Memorial", Springfield

Iowa
Veterans Memorial Building

Indiana
 Soldiers' and Sailors' Monument, Indianapolis

Louisiana
 The Hiker, Spanish American War Monument, 
 "Spanish–American War Memorial", City Park, Baton Rouge

Maine
 "Spanish-American War Monument", Monument Park, Houlton

Massachusetts

 "The Volunteer", Marlborough 
 "Spanish American War Memorial", Concord 
 "Spanish–American War Memorial", Springfield

Michigan
 Spanish American War Memorial, Belle Isle, Detroit, dedicated in 1932

Mississippi
 "Spanish–American War Memorial", War Memorial Building, Jackson 
 "Soldiers Monument", Louisville

New Hampshire 

 "Spanish War Veterans 1898-1902", Manchester

New Jersey
 Spanish American War Memorial, Morristown

New York

Dewey Arch, triumphal arch honoring Admiral George Dewey which stood at Madison Square Park from 1899 to 1900.  The monument was removed as Dewey's fame and reputation sank during the unpopular 1899-1902 Philippine–American War.
Spanish American War Monument to the 71st Infantry Regiment, Mount Hope Cemetery, Rochester
Spanish–American War Monument in honor of those who served in the City of Rochester and Monroe County, Rochester Community War Memorial Terrace

Ohio
Dayton Memorial Hall

Oregon
 Fountain for Company H, Portland
 Spanish–American War Soldier's Monument, Portland
 Spanish–American War Veterans Memorial, Portland
 Theodore Roosevelt Memorial, Portland

Rhode Island
 "Spanish American War Memorial", Woonsocket, Rhode Island 
 The Hiker, Spanish American War Monument

South Carolina
 Spanish–American War Monument, State House Grounds, Columbia

Texas
 Spanish–American War Memorial, City Hall, Wichita Falls 
 The Hiker, Spanish American War Monument, Austin

Virginia 

Spanish–American War Memorial (Arlington National Cemetery), Virginia
Spanish–American War Nurses Memorial, Arlington National Cemetery, Virginia
Rough Riders Memorial, Arlington National Cemetery, Virginia 
The Hiker, a memorial to the veterans of the Spanish-American War and the Philippine Insurrection  located along Memorial Drive or the Avenue of Heroes, the approach to Arlington National Cemetery.

Wisconsin
 Spanish–American War Soldier, Milwaukee, Wisconsin

References

Spanish-American War
List